Aglaia is a genus of 117 species of woody dioecious trees belonging to the Mahogany family (Meliaceae). These trees occur in the subtropical and tropical forests of Southeast Asia, Northern Australia and the Pacific.

Some species are important timber trees; others have scented flowers, or medicinal properties (the edible fruits duku or langsat have now been placed in the genus Lansium).  Many have complex biological relationships with their dispersal agents.

Phytochemistry 
Species in the genus Aglaia synthesize a unique class of highly bioactive chemical compounds known as flavaglines. Over 50 unique compounds of this class have been described so far, including rocaglamide, aglafoline, silvestrol, pannellin, episilvestrol, and ponapensin. They are known for their anti-cancer, anti-fungal, anti-inflammatory and insecticidal properties. Several of these compounds have been shown to be exceptional therapeutic agents for cancer chemotherapy, however further research is needed to develop medicines.

Species
Due to considerable morphological variation, this genus presents numerous taxonomic problems, with the number of accepted species varying from 117 to over 390 depending on the species concept used.

Aglaia abbreviata: (China)
Aglaia acariaeantha: (New Guinea)
Aglaia acida: (Java)
Aglaia acminatissima: (Malaysia)
Aglaia acuminata: (Philippines)
Aglaia affinis: (Philippines)
Aglaia agglomerata: (New Guinea)
Aglaia agusanensis: (Philippines)
Aglaia aherniana: (Philippines)
Aglaia allocotantha: (New Guinea)
Aglaia alternifoliola: (Philippines)
Aglaia amplexicaulis
Aglaia andamanica: (Andaman islands)
Aglaia angustifolia: (Sumatra)
Aglaia annamensis: (SE Asia)
Aglaia antonii: (Philippines)
Aglaia apiocarpa: (Sri Lanka)
Aglaia apoana: (Philippines)
Aglaia araeantha: (New Guinea)
Aglaia archboldiana
Aglaia argentea: (Java)
Aglaia aspera: (Java)
Aglaia attenuata: (China)
Aglaia australiensis: (Queensland)
Aglaia axillaris
Aglaia badia: (Philippines)
Aglaia bamleri: (New Guinea)
Aglaia banahaensis: (Philippines)
Aglaia baramensis: (Borneo)
Aglaia barbanthera: (New Guinea)
Aglaia barbatula: (Java)
Aglaia barberi: (India)
Aglaia basiphylla: (Fiji)
Aglaia batjanica: (Malaysia)
Aglaia bauerleni: (New Guinea)
Aglaia beccarii: (Borneo)
Aglaia bergmanni: (Pacific)
Aglaia bernardoi: (Philippines)
Aglaia betchei: (Samoa)
Aglaia bicolor: (Philippines)
Aglaia boanana: (New Guinea)
Aglaia bordenii: (Philippines)
Aglaia borneensis: (Borneo)
Aglaia bourdillonii
Aglaia brachybotrys: (Philippines)
Aglaia brassii: (Solomon Islands)
Aglaia brevipeduncula: (New Guinea)
Aglaia brevipetiolata: (Philippines)
Aglaia brownii: (Queensland, New Guinea)
Aglaia bullata: (Borneo)
Aglaia cagayanensis: (Philippines)
Aglaia calelanensis: (Philippines)
Aglaia canarensis: (India)
Aglaia canariifolia: (Sulawesi)
Aglaia caroli: (New Guinea)
Aglaia carrii: (New Guinea)
Aglaia caudatifoliolata: (Borneo)
Aglaia cauliflora: (Sulawesi)
Aglaia caulobotrys: (Philippines)
Aglaia cedreloides: (New Guinea)
Aglaia celebica: (Sulawesi)
Aglaia ceramica
Aglaia chalmersi: (New Guinea)
Aglaia chartacea: (Sumatra)
Aglaia chaudocensis: (SE Asia)
Aglaia chittagonga: (Bangladesh, Taiwan, Thailand)
Aglaia cinerea: (Malaya)
Aglaia cinnamomea: (New Guinea)
Aglaia clarkii: (Philippines)
Aglaia clemensiae: (New Guinea)
Aglaia clementis: (Borneo)
Aglaia conferta: (New Guinea)
Aglaia confertiflora: (Borneo)
Aglaia congylos: (Sri Lanka)
Aglaia copelandii: (Philippines)
Aglaia cordata: (Malaysia)
Aglaia coriacea: (Borneo)
Aglaia costata: (Philippines)
Aglaia crassinervia: (India)
Aglaia cremea: (New Guinea)
Aglaia cucullata
Aglaia cumingiana
Aglaia cuprea: (Philippines)
Aglaia cupreo-lepidota: (Philippines)
Aglaia curranii: (Philippines)
Aglaia curtisii
Aglaia cuspidata: (New Guinea)
Aglaia cuspidella: (Borneo)
Aglaia dasyclada: (China)
Aglaia davaoensis: (Philippines)
Aglaia densisquama: (Borneo)
Aglaia densitricha: (Malaysia)
Aglaia denticulata: (Philippines)
Aglaia diepenhorstii: (Sumatra)
Aglaia diffusa: (Philippines)
Aglaia diffusiflora: (Philippines)
Aglaia discolor: (Borneo)
Aglaia doctersiana: (New Guinea)
Aglaia duperreana: (SE Asia)
Aglaia dyeri: (Sulawesi)
Aglaia dysoxylifolia: (Sulawesi)
Aglaia edelfeldti: (New Guinea)
Aglaia edulis: (Tropical Asia)
Aglaia elaeagnoidea: (SE Asia, Queensland)
Aglaia elaphina: (New Guinea)
Aglaia elliptica
Aglaia elliptifolia: (Philippines)
Aglaia elmeri: (Borneo)
Aglaia ermischii: (Pacific)
Aglaia erythrosperma: (Malaysia, Borneo)
Aglaia euphorioides: (SE Asia)
Aglaia euryanthera: (New Guinea)
Aglaia euryphylla: (Java)
Aglaia eusideroxylon: (Java)
Aglaia evansensis
Aglaia everettii: (Philippines)
Aglaia exigua: (New Guinea)
Aglaia exstipulata
Aglaia flavescens: (New Guinea)
Aglaia flavida: (New Guinea)
Aglaia forbesiana: (New Guinea)
Aglaia forbesii: (Malaysia)
Aglaia forstenii: (Ambon)
Aglaia foveolata: (Malaysia, Borneo, Sumatra)
Aglaia fragilis
Aglaia fraseri: (Borneo)
Aglaia fusca: (Andaman Islands)
Aglaia gagnepainiana: (Laos)
Aglaia gamopetala: (Borneo)
Aglaia ganggo: (Sumatra)
Aglaia gibbsiae: (New Guinea)
Aglaia gjellerupii: (New Guinea)
Aglaia glabrata
Aglaia glabriflora: (Malaysia)
Aglaia glaucescens: (Andaman Islands)
Aglaia glomerata: (Philippines)
Aglaia goebeliana: (Pacific)
Aglaia gracilis
Aglaia gracillima: (New Guinea)
Aglaia grandifoliola: (Philippines)
Aglaia grandis: (Borneo)
Aglaia greenwoodii
Aglaia griffithii: (Malaysia)
Aglaia hapalantha: (New Guinea)
Aglaia haplophylla: (Malaysia)
Aglaia harmsiana: (Philippines)
Aglaia hartmanni: (New Guinea)
Aglaia haslettiana: (India)
Aglaia havilandii: (Borneo)
Aglaia hemsleyi: (Sulawesi)
Aglaia heptandra: (Java)
Aglaia heterobotrys: (Sumatra)
Aglaia heteroclita: (Malaysia)
Aglaia heterophylla: (Borneo)
Aglaia heterotricha: (Tonga)
Aglaia hexandra: (Philippines)
Aglaia hiernii: (Malaysia)
Aglaia hoanensis: (SE Asia)
Aglaia hoii: (Vietnam)
Aglaia huberti: (Borneo)
Aglaia humilis
Aglaia hypoleuca: (Sumatra)
Aglaia ignea: (Sumatra)
Aglaia iloilo: (Philippines)
Aglaia insignis: (Borneo)
Aglaia integrifolia: (New Guinea)
Aglaia intricatoreticulata: (Malaysia)
Aglaia janowskyi: (New Guinea)
Aglaia javanica: (Sulawesi)
Aglaia kabaensis: (Sumatra)
Aglaia khasiana: (Indonesia)
Aglaia kingiana
Aglaia korthalsii: (SE Asia)
Aglaia kunstleri
Aglaia laevigata: (Philippines)
Aglaia lagunensis: (Philippines)
Aglaia lanceolata: (Philippines)
Aglaia lancilimba: (Philippines)
Aglaia langlassei: (Philippines)
Aglaia lanuginosa
Aglaia latifolia: (Java)
Aglaia lauterbachiana: (New Guinea)
Aglaia lawii: (India, SE Asia)
Aglaia laxiflora: (Borneo)
Aglaia ledermannii: (New Guinea)
Aglaia leeuwenii: (New Guinea)
Aglaia lepidopetala: (New Guinea)
Aglaia lepiorrhachis: (New Guinea)
Aglaia leptantha: (Southeast Asia)
Aglaia leptoclada: (New Guinea)
Aglaia leucoclada: (New Guinea)
Aglaia leucophylla
Aglaia littoralis: (Indonesia)
Aglaia llanosiana: (Philippines)
Aglaia longepetiolulata: (Sumatra)
Aglaia longifolia: (Java)
Aglaia longipetiolata: (Philippines)
Aglaia luzoniensis
Aglaia maboroana: (New Guinea)
Aglaia mackiana: (New Guinea)
Aglaia macrobotrys: (Philippines)
Aglaia macrocarpa
Aglaia macrostigma
Aglaia magnifoliola: (Sunda Island)
Aglaia maiae: (Indonesia)
Aglaia maingayi: (Malaysia)
Aglaia malabarica: (India)
Aglaia malaccensis
Aglaia marginata: (Thailand)
Aglaia mariannensis: (Philippines)
Aglaia matthewsii: (Borneo)
Aglaia megistocarpa: (Borneo)
Aglaia meliosmoides: (Thailand)
Aglaia membranifolia: (Malaysia)
Aglaia menadonensis: (Sulawesi)
Aglaia meridionalis
Aglaia merrillii: (Philippines)
Aglaia micrantha: (Philippines)
Aglaia micropora: (Philippines)
Aglaia minahassae: (Sulawesi)
Aglaia mindanaensis: (Philippines)
Aglaia minutiflora: (Indonesia)
Aglaia mirandae: (Philippines)
Aglaia monophylla: (Philippines)
Aglaia monozyga: (Borneo)
Aglaia montana: (Java)
Aglaia motleyana: (Borneo)
Aglaia moultonii: (Borneo)
Aglaia mucronulata: (Java)
Aglaia multiflora: (Philippines)
Aglaia multifoliola: (Philippines)
Aglaia multijuga: (Fiji)
Aglaia multinervis
Aglaia myriantha: (Philippines)
Aglaia myristicifolia: (New Guinea)
Aglaia negrosensis: (Philippines)
Aglaia neotenica: (Borneo)
Aglaia nivea
Aglaia nudibacca: (Solomon Islands)
Aglaia oblanceolata: (Thailand)
Aglaia obliqua: (New Guinea)
Aglaia oblonga: (SE Asia)
Aglaia ochneocarpa: (Sumatra)
Aglaia odoardoi: (Borneo)
Aglaia odorata: Chinese Rice Flower (China)
Aglaia odoratissima
Aglaia oligantha: (Philippines)
Aglaia oligocarpa: (Sumatra)
Aglaia oligophylla: (SE Asia)
Aglaia oxypetala
Aglaia pachyphylla: (Sumatra)
Aglaia palauensis: (Palau island)
Aglaia palawanensis
Aglaia palembanica: (Borneo)
Aglaia pallida
Aglaia pamattonis: (Borneo)
Aglaia paniculata: (Indonesia)
Aglaia parksii
Aglaia parviflora: (New Guinea)
Aglaia parvifolia: (Philippines)
Aglaia parvifoliola: (New Guinea)
Aglaia pauciflora: (Philippines)
Aglaia pedicellaris: (Indonesia)
Aglaia peekelii: (Bismarck Archipel)
Aglaia penningtoniana: (New Guinea)
Aglaia perfulva: (Philippines)
Aglaia perviridis: (Indonesia)
Aglaia phaeogyna: (New Guinea)
Aglaia pirifera: synonym of Aglaia edulis
Aglaia pleuropteris: (Vietnam)
Aglaia poilanei: (Vietnam)
Aglaia polyneura: (New Guinea)
Aglaia polyphylla: (Java)
Aglaia ponapensis (Caroline Islands)
Aglaia porulifera: (New Guinea)
Aglaia poulocondorensis: (SE Asia)
Aglaia procera: (Solomon Islands)
Aglaia psilopetala: (Polynesia)
Aglaia puberulanthera: (New Guinea)
Aglaia puncticulata: (Philippines)
Aglaia pycnocarpa: (Sumatra)
Aglaia pycnoneura: (New Guinea)
Aglaia pyramidata: (China)
Aglaia pyricarpa: (Sumatra)
Aglaia pyriformis: (Philippines)
Aglaia pyrrholepis: (Java)
Aglaia querciflorescens: (Philippines)
Aglaia quocensis: (SE Asia)
Aglaia racemosa: (Borneo)
Aglaia ramosii: (Philippines)
Aglaia ramotricha: (Borneo)
Aglaia ramuensis: (New Guinea)
Aglaia rechingerae: (Bismarck Archipelago)
Aglaia reinwardtii: (Sulawesi)
Aglaia repoeuensis: (SE Asia)
Aglaia reticulata: (Philippines)
Aglaia rimosa
Aglaia rivularis: (Borneo)
Aglaia rizalensis: (Philippines)
Aglaia robinsonii: (Philippines)
Aglaia rodatzii: (New Guinea)
Aglaia roemeri: (New Guinea)
Aglaia roxburghiana: (SE Asia)
Aglaia rubiginosa
Aglaia rubra: (New Guinea)
Aglaia rubrivenia: (Solomon Islands)
Aglaia rudolfi: (New Guinea)
Aglaia rufa: (Sumatra)
Aglaia rufibarbis
Aglaia rufinervis
Aglaia rugulosa: (Malaysia, Borneo)
Aglaia salicifolia: (Malaysia)
Aglaia saltatorum: (Tonga Island)
Aglaia samarensis: (Philippines)
Aglaia samoensis: (Samoa)
Aglaia sapindina: (Australia, Indonesia, Papua New Guinea, Solomon Islands)
Aglaia saxonii: (New Guinea)
Aglaia schlechteri: (New Guinea)
Aglaia schraderiana: (New Guinea)
Aglaia schultzei: (New Guinea)
Aglaia sclerocarpa: (Sulawesi)
Aglaia scortechinii
Aglaia sessilifolia
Aglaia sexipetala
Aglaia shawiana: (Borneo)
Aglaia sibuyanensis: (Philippines)
Aglaia silvestris
Aglaia simplex: (Borneo)
Aglaia simplicifolia: (New Guinea)
Aglaia smithii: (Sulawesi)
Aglaia soepadmoi
Aglaia somalensis: (Somaliland)
Aglaia sorsogonensis: (Philippines)
Aglaia spaniantha: (New Guinea)
Aglaia speciosa
Aglaia spectabilis
Aglaia splendens: (Java)
Aglaia squamulosa: (SE Asia)
Aglaia stapfii: (Sulawesi)
Aglaia steinii: (New Guinea)
Aglaia stellatopilosa
Aglaia stellato-tomentosa: (Philippines)
Aglaia stellipila: (New Guinea)
Aglaia stenophylla: (Philippines)
Aglaia sterculioides: (Borneo)
Aglaia subcuprea: (New Guinea)
Aglaia subgrisea: (Malaysia)
Aglaia subminutiflora: (New Guinea)
Aglaia submonophylla: (Borneo)
Aglaia subsessilis: (Borneo)
Aglaia subviridis: (Philippines)
Aglaia sulingi: (Java)
Aglaia tarangisi: (Philippines)
Aglaia tayabensis: (Philippines)
Aglaia taynguyenensis: (Vietnam)
Aglaia tembelingensis: (Malaysia)
Aglaia tenuicaulis: (Malaysia)
Aglaia tenuifolia: (China)
Aglaia testicularis: (China)
Aglaia teysmanniana: (Sumatra)
Aglaia tomentosa: (Indonesia)
Aglaia trichostemon: (Borneo)
Aglaia trichostoma: (New Guinea)
Aglaia trimera: (Borneo)
Aglaia tripetala: (Borneo)
Aglaia trunciflora: (Philippines)
Aglaia tsangii: (China)
Aglaia turczaninowii: (Philippines)
Aglaia ulawaensis: (Solomon Islands)
Aglaia umbrina: (Philippines)
Aglaia undulata: (Indonesia)
Aglaia unifolia
Aglaia unifoliata: (Borneo)
Aglaia urdanetensis: (Philippines)
Aglaia uropbylla: (New Guinea)
Aglaia variisquama: (Malaysia, Borneo)
Aglaia venusta: (Hawaii)
Aglaia versteeghii: (New Guinea)
Aglaia villamilii: (Philippines)
Aglaia vitiensis: (Hawaii)
Aglaia vulpina: (New Guinea)
Aglaia wallichii: (Indonesia)
Aglaia wangii: (China)
Aglaia whitmeei: (Samoa)
Aglaia winckelii: (Java)
Aglaia yunnanensis: (China)
Aglaia yzermannii: (Malaysia)
Aglaia zippelii: (New Guinea)
Aglaia zollingeri: (Java)

References

External links
 

 
Meliaceae genera
Dioecious plants